Captain Guy Dennis Gruters (born October 26, 1942) was a United States Air Force officer and fighter pilot best known for his survival for over five years as a prisoner of war in Vietnam. He was one of the five hundred and ninety-one surviving POWs of all military services released in 1973 for return to the United States during Operation Homecoming.

Early life and education
Guy Gruters was born in 1942 in Sarasota, Florida, but raised in New Jersey, where he spent his childhood trapping muskrat, camping, hunting and Scouting (Eagle Scout rank awarded). He won acceptance to the United States Air Force Academy and graduated with a Bachelor of Science degree in engineering science (summa cum laude, ranked 7th in his graduating class overall, #1 in Engineering Science) in 1964. He then went on to Purdue University and completed a Master of Science degree in astronautical engineering in less than one year, in 1965.

Air Force service
Following his graduation from Purdue, he was sent to flight school. After Undergraduate Pilot Training at Moody AFB, Georgia, he received his pilot wings in March 1966. He completed F-100 Super Sabre Combat Crew Training with the 4514th Combat Crew Training Squadron at Luke AFB, Arizona, in October 1966 and then O-1 Bird Dog Forward Air Controller Training in February 1967. Following this, he volunteered for Vietnam and served six years, more than five years of which was as a POW. During his flight operations as a Forward Air Controller in the first 10 months, Guy flew more than 400 combat missions, first for the 173rd Airborne Brigade in the O-1 Bird Dog light observation aircraft and then for the MISTY Fast FACS in the F-100F Super Sabre over North Vietnam.

As a co-pilot of the two-seat F-100F, Gruters was shot down twice.

Gruters was shot down for the second time on December 20, 1967. He and fellow pilot, Colonel Robert R. Craner ejected under  inverted after losing all hydraulic control.  They were captured and imprisoned in the Hỏa Lò Prison (Hanoi Hilton) among other camps for over five years. Upon their initial incarceration, Gruters and Craner cared for Lance Sijan before Sijan succumbed to wounds and torture in January 1968.

Gruters spent 5 years and 3 months as a prisoner of war before his release in 1973.

Awards and decorations
Guy Gruters' decorations include more than thirty combat awards, with two Silver Stars, two DFCs, two Purple Hearts, a Bronze Star Medal for Valor, the POW Medal, a Presidential Unit Citation, 20 Air Medals and other medals.

Other honors
Guy Gruters' testimony was instrumental in Lance Sijan receiving the Medal of Honor posthumously in 1976. Guy Gruters' story was described in the book, "Bury Us Upside Down," "Into the Mouth of the Cat", and "Misty: Fast FACS."

References

External links

1942 births
Living people
People from Sarasota, Florida
People from New Jersey
Vietnam War prisoners of war
United States Air Force Academy alumni
Purdue University School of Aeronautics and Astronautics alumni
American aerospace engineers
United States Air Force officers
Shot-down aviators
Aviators from New Jersey
American torture victims
Recipients of the Silver Star
Recipients of the Distinguished Flying Cross (United States)
Engineers from Florida